Joseph Hector Gilles Villemure (born May 30, 1940) is a Canadian former professional ice hockey goaltender.  He played for the New York Rangers and Chicago Black Hawks in the 1960s and 1970s. Villemure was born in Trois-Rivières, Quebec.

Playing career
Villemure played a season in the junior leagues with the Guelph Biltmores of the Ontario Hockey Association (OHA). He then spent ten years in the minor leagues, principally with the Vancouver Canucks of the Western Hockey League (WHL), the Baltimore Clippers and the Buffalo Bisons of the American Hockey League (AHL). He was a star in the minors; in each of his final two seasons in the AHL, 1968–69 and 1969–70, he won the Les Cunningham Award with the Bisons as the league's most valuable player, leading all goaltenders in the playoffs the second year to backstop the Bisons to the Calder Cup in their final season. During his minor league career, he led his league in goals against average three times and in shutouts five times. During this time he was called up on several brief occasions by the New York Rangers, with whom he had signed in 1964.

The 1970–71 season saw Villemure called to the NHL for good as the Rangers' backup to Eddie Giacomin. Over the next three seasons, Villemure recorded a sparkling 66–27–10 mark, with ten shutouts and a goals-against average never higher than 2.30, and shared the Vezina Trophy with Giacomin in 1971. He played in the NHL All-Star Game all three seasons, allowing only a single goal and recording the lowest career GAA of any All-Star Game goaltender. The Rangers were a powerhouse at that time, reaching the Stanley Cup finals in 1972.

By the 1974–75 season, with both goaltenders aging, Villemure had become the number one goaltender in New York, but had only modest success, and was traded to the Chicago Black Hawks in the off-season. He backed up Tony Esposito and appeared in only 21 games in two years, and he retired after the 1976–77 season.

In 2009, the book 100 Ranger Greats ranked Villemure No. 48 all-time of the 901 New York Rangers who had played during the team's first 82 seasons.

During the off-season, Villemure was a professional harness racehorse driver. He now resides in Levittown, New York.

Career statistics

Regular season and playoffs

Awards and honors

 Rookie of the Year in the WHL in 1963.
 Named to the WHL's First All-Star Team in 1966.
 Named to the AHL's Second All-Star Team in 1967.
 Won the Hap Holmes Memorial Award in 1969 and 1970.
 Won the Les Cunningham Award in 1969 and 1970.
 Named to the AHL First All-Star Team in 1969 and 1970.
 Calder Cup championship in 1970.
 Vezina Trophy winner in 1971 (shared with Eddie Giacomin).
 Named to play in the NHL All-Star Game in 1971, 1972 and 1973.

References

External links
 

1940 births
Living people
Baltimore Clippers players
Buffalo Bisons (AHL) players
Canadian expatriate ice hockey players in the United States
Canadian ice hockey goaltenders
Charlotte Checkers (EHL) players
Chicago Blackhawks players
French Quebecers
Guelph Biltmore Mad Hatters players
Ice hockey people from Quebec
Johnstown Jets players
Long Island Ducks (ice hockey) players
New York Rangers players
New York Rovers players
People from Levittown, New York
Sportspeople from Trois-Rivières
Troy Bruins players
Vezina Trophy winners
Vancouver Canucks (WHL) players